Sriracha is a 2013 American documentary film directed by Griffin Hammond. The film features David Tran discussing the origins of his Huy Fong Foods sriracha sauce.

Release
On December 11, 2013, the film was released to Vimeo digitally for the price of five US dollars initially.

Film festival circuit

The film was officially selected at a number of film festivals across the United States and other countries.

2014
 March 21 - Gasparilla International Film Festival (Tampa, Florida)
 March 29 & 31 - Atlanta Film Festival (Atlanta, Georgia)
 April 3 - Food & Farm Film Festival (San Francisco, California)
 April 7 - Bare Bones International Independent Film Festival (Muskogee, Oklahoma)
 April 12 - DisOrient Asian American Film Festival (Eugene, Oregon)
 April 13 - New Art Film Festival (Champaign, Illinois)
 April 16 - Illinois State University Documentary Film Festival (Normal, Illinois)
 June 3 - 17th Annual Dances with Films Film Festival (Los Angeles, California)
 June 22 - Houston Asian Pacific American Film Festival (Houston, Texas)
 August 16 - The Food & Farm Film Festival (Monte Rio, California)
 September 5 - 4th Annual DOCUTAH Film Festival (St. George, Utah)
 September 15 - 7th Annual Naperville Independent Film Festival (Naperville, Illinois)
 September 26 & 27 - 4th Annual Crested Butte Film Festival (Crested Butte, Colorado)
 October 11 - 10th Annual Atlanta Asian Film Festival (Atlanta, Georgia)
 October 14 - 4th Annual Life Sciences Film Festival (Prague, Czech Republic)
 October 30 - 8th Annual NYC Food Film Festival (New York City)
 November 8 - 18th Annual Vancouver Asian Film Festival (Vancouver, British Columbia, Canada)
 November 13 - 4th Devour! The Food Film Fest (Wolfville, Nova Scotia, Canada)
 November 20 - 5th Annual Chicago Food Film Festival (Chicago, Illinois)
 November 21 - 5th Annual St. Louis International Film Festival (St. Louis, Missouri)

2015
 February 13 & 14, 2015 - Seattle Asian American Film Festival
 March 27, 2015 - 3rd Annual Asians on Film Festival

Reception
L.V. Anderson of Slate gave the film a mixed review, criticizing the main focus on the public's opinion of sriracha sauce, but praised the informational aspects of the film. He closed his review saying, "Is [the film] worth $5 and half an hour of your time? I guess it depends on how much you love sriracha." Maria Godoy of NPR described the film as, "a less-than-rhapsodic view of the sauce," citing back to Anderson's review from Slate. She also stated, "...such quibbles are unlikely to deter die-hard Sriracha lovers from watching Hammond's film. After all, if you're the type to snatch up Sriracha-flavored lip balm or have ever felt tempted to tattoo that rooster label on your leg, then why not shell out the five bucks it costs to stream this movie ode to your savory beloved on your screen?" Joshua David Stein of Eater.com gave the film a two out of five star rating, criticizing the way the story was told, soundtrack, and Hammond's direction. However, he praised the film's informational aspects and cinematography.

References

External links

2013 documentary films
2013 films
American documentary films
Documentary films about food and drink
2010s English-language films
2010s American films